The Alley of Honor (Honorary Allée) is a public cemetery and memorial in Baku, Azerbaijan. The Alley includes burials of famed Azerbaijanis and Azerbaijan-affiliated expatriates, including several Presidents, scientists and artists. There are over 280 burials in total.

History
The Alley was established by the order of the Council of Ministers of Azerbaijan SSR on August 27, 1948. According to the list enclosed to the order, the burials of prominent Azerbaijani figures Jalil Mammadguluzade, Abdurrahim bey Hagverdiyev, Najaf bey Vazirov, Hasan bey Zardabi, Huseyn Arablinski, Suleyman Sani Akhundov, Ali Nazmi, Jabbar Garyagdioglu, Rustam Mustafayev, Azim Azimzade and Huseyngulu Sarabski had to be moved to the Alley of Honor and gravestones set to them.

Notable interments

 Vasif Adigozalov, composer
 Mahmud Aliyev, Minister of Foreign Affairs
 Heydar Aliyev, President
 Alasgar Alakbarov, actor
 Shovkat Alakbarova, singer
 Fikret Amirov, composer
 Azim Azimzade, painter
 Leyla Badirbeyli, actress
 Abulfaz Elchibey, President
 Valeh Barshadly, general and first Minister of Defense
 Rashid Behbudov, singer
 Bulbul, singer
 Vugar Gashimov, chess grandmaster
 Tofig Guliyev, composer
 Jafar Jabbarly, poet
 Uzeyir Hajibeyov, composer
 Elmira Qafarova, Minister of Foreign Affairs, Speaker of National Assembly
 Muslim Magomayev, composer
 Muslim Magomayev, Soviet singer
 Tahira Tahirova, diplomat and Minister of Foreign Affairs
 Rasul Rza, writer
 Khalil Rza Uluturk, poet
 Tofig Safaraliyev, statesman, Minister of Industrial Construction of the Azerbaijan SSR
 Abdulla Shaig, poet
 Seyid Shushinski, khananda
 Ismayil Shykhly, Azerbaijani writer
 Hasan bey Zardabi, publicist

Gallery

See also 
 Martyrs' Lane
 Chemberekend Cemetery

References

1948 establishments in the Soviet Union
Tourist attractions in Baku
Cemeteries in Baku
Cemeteries established in the 1940s